Albert Gallatin Talbott (April 4, 1808 – September 9, 1887) was a United States representative from Kentucky and a slaveholder. He was the uncle of William Clayton Anderson and Margaret Anderson Watts.

He was born near Paris, Kentucky and he moved with his parents to Clark County, Kentucky in 1813 and to Jessamine County, Kentucky in 1818. For education, he attended Forrest Hill Academy, Jessamine County, Kentucky and also studied law, but did not practice. He engaged in agricultural pursuits and general trading in 1831 before he moved to Mercer County, Kentucky in 1838 and engaged in the real estate business. He moved to Danville, Kentucky in 1846.

Talbott was a delegate to the Kentucky constitutional convention in 1849 and a member of the Kentucky House of Representatives in 1850. He was elected as a Democrat to the Thirty-fourth and Thirty-fifth Congresses (March 4, 1855 – March 3, 1859) and served as chairman, Committee on Expenditures in the Post Office Department (Thirty-fifth Congress). After leaving Congress, he resumed real estate pursuits. He served in the Kentucky Senate 1869–1873 and again a member of the Kentucky House of Representatives in 1883. Later, he moved to Pennsylvania and settled near Chestnut Hill, Pennsylvania and engaged in agricultural pursuits. He died in Philadelphia, Pennsylvania in 1887 and was buried in Bellevue Cemetery in Danville, Kentucky.

References

Sources

1808 births
1887 deaths
Burials in Bellevue Cemetery (Danville, Kentucky)
Democratic Party members of the Kentucky House of Representatives
Democratic Party Kentucky state senators
People from Paris, Kentucky
Politicians from Danville, Kentucky
Democratic Party members of the United States House of Representatives from Kentucky
19th-century American politicians